Space Ghost Coast to Coast is an animated late-night talk show. It is hosted by washed-up superhero Space Ghost and co-stars his archenemies Zorak and Moltar, who he has imprisoned and enslaved. Zorak is bandleader and Moltar is director and producer. They regularly disrupt the show in contempt of Space Ghost.

The name Alan Laddie was the nom de plume for the show's writing staff.

Two unaired pilots were created, the first released as a special feature on the Volume Two DVD set. The series premiered on April 15, 1994, and ended on May 31, 2008, with a total of 109 episodes over the course of 11 seasons.

Series overview

Episodes

Pilots (1993–2004)

Season 1 (1994)

Season 2 (1995)

Season 3 (1996)

Season 4 (1997)

Season 5 (1998)

Season 6 (1999)

Season 7 (2001–02) 
The series' revival run was announced in early 2001, as Cartoon Network aired the first two revival era episodes on their main channel as sneak peeks prior to the launch of Adult Swim. The series moved to Adult Swim on September 2, 2001 with the premiere of "Knifin' Around". Another episode featuring Merrill Markoe titled "Drop Out" was planned for this run of episodes but was never produced. The series' revival run is the first season of the show after Hanna-Barbera was absorbed into Warner Bros. Animation in 2001 (due to William Hanna's death of throat cancer).

Season 8 (2003) 
Two other episodes were planned for this season but scrapped. One entitled "One Way Out" would have featured Seth Green, while the other, untitled episode would have featured Seth MacFarlane.

=== Season 9 (2004) ===

Season 10 (2006–07)

Season 11 (2007–08)

Specials

See also 
 List of Space Ghost Coast to Coast characters

References

External links 
 
 
 
 

Space Ghost
Space Ghost
Space Ghost Coast to Coast